Bothidae or lefteye flounders are a family of flounders. They are called "lefteye flounders" because most species lie on the sea bottom on their right sides, with both eyes on their left sides. The family is also distinguished by the presence of spines on the snout and near the eyes.

See also 
 Pleuronectidae, the righteye family of flounders

References 

 
Marine fish families
Taxa named by Albert Günther